The British Rail Class 37 is a diesel-electric locomotive.  Also known as the English Electric Type 3, the class was ordered as part of the British Rail modernisation plan. They were numbered in two series, D6600–D6608 and D6700–D6999.

The Class 37 became a familiar sight on many parts of the British Rail network, in particular forming the main motive power for InterCity services in East Anglia and within Scotland. They also performed well on secondary and inter-regional services for many years. Many are still in use today on freight, maintenance, and empty stock movement duties. The Class 37s are known to some railway enthusiasts as "tractors", a nickname given due to the similarities between the sound of the Class 37's engine and that of a tractor.

Description

Background 
English Electric had already been successful with orders for type 1 and type 4 diesels, and had produced locomotives of similar power for railways in East Africa. A design based on the exported locomotives was put forward and accepted. The design was for a general purpose locomotive and initially found service in British Rail's Eastern Region.

Building 

There was no prototype. British Railways placed an order for forty-two Class 37 locomotives in January 1959. The first was delivered in November 1960; it entered service on 2 December. BR had ordered further Class 37s before the last of the original batch had been completed in mid-1962. The final locomotive was delivered to the Western Region on 9 November 1965. English Electric split the construction between Vulcan Foundry at Newton-le-Willows, and Robert Stephenson and Hawthorns of Darlington. The 309 locomotives produced in total were originally numbered in the range D6700–D6999 and D6600–D6608. The bodywork bears a strong family resemblance to other English Electric designs such as the Class 40 and Class 23 'Baby Deltic'.

Seven orders were placed with English Electric, as follows:

Duties 

The class was designed for both passenger and freight work. Many of the original locomotives were fitted with boilers for steam heating. D6700-6754 were fitted with boilers from new, along with D6758, D6775, D6781–D6818, D6875–D6892. D6960-6968 received boilers from D6701-6709 during 1967/68. 37247 was fitted with a boiler in 1977. With the withdrawal of many Type 2 and Type 3 locomotives in the 1980s the 37s were selected as the standard Type 3 and many of the fleet were given a heavy overhaul to prolong their life into the 1990s and beyond. Some were fitted with electrical train heating (ETH) equipment in the 1980s to become the 37/4 sub-class, initially for use on the West Highland Line, the Welsh Marches line and South Wales–Bristol area services and Far North Lines but later seeing use in north/mid Wales and occasionally the West Country. In 2010, they were used on passenger services on the Cumbrian Coast line and Wherry lines.

Rebuilding 
A number of locomotives were rebuilt as Class 37/9s in the late 1980s to evaluate Mirrlees and Ruston engines for possible use on a new Class 38 freight locomotive. These locos were heavily ballasted to improve traction and had excellent load-hauling capabilities, but the Class 38, understood to be a 'modular' locomotive based on the approach that gave rise to the Class 58 diesel loco and the proposed Class 88 electric loco, was never built.

Axle load 

The Class 37 has a relatively low axle loading for its size and power. With the withdrawal of most of the smaller types of diesel locomotive, this left it as the only mainline type available in significant numbers for lines with weight restrictions, and for a number of years 37s handled almost all locomotive-hauled services on the West Highland Line, the lines north of Inverness (Far North Line) and in parts of Wales. The Class 37 has Route Availability 5 and this is one of the main reasons it is still in use on the network.  Note that class 37/7 and 37/9 have an RA of 7 due to their extra ballast weights.

Regional variations 
There are several differences between particular locomotives, some of them easily seen. Western Region Class 37s can be identified by 'cow horns' around halfway up on the outer edge of each end of the lamp brackets. When British Railways took over from the Great Western Railway the use of Great Western lamps continued. Their brackets used an L-shaped upright that was parallel to the direction of travel, unlike the other regions which used transverse brackets. Another difference between the regions is by the nose end headcodes. Lower-numbered, split-box Class 37s were allocated to northern England and east Anglia; centre-box locomotives were almost all allocated to Wales and the south west. After locomotives were transferred between pools in the 1980s they tended to stray from their original depots. Regional decorations included the Highland (Inverness) Stag, the Cockney Sparrow (Stratford) the Cornish lizard (St Blazey) and Eastfield Highland Terrier. All the Cardiff Canton Class 37/4s received Celtic Dragons below the driver's window whilst in large logo blue. Some Scottish locomotives were later fitted with small Saltire flags by their TOPS data panels or on their noses in a similar fashion to the HAA hoppers allocated to Scottish power stations.

British Rail liveries 
On delivery, the Class 37s were painted in plain green with a grey roof, the 'late' (post-1956) British Railways crest and a D prefix to their running number. Some locomotives were delivered as the small yellow warning panel was introduced, earlier locomotives being given these panels during works visits. Towards the late 1960s, the yellow was extended to the full height of the nose.

By the 1970s, all locomotives had received all over British Rail blue with a full yellow nose; by 1975 most locomotives had also received their TOPS numbers. Their livery remained the same until the early 1980s when 'Large Logo blue' was introduced. This entailed the yellow nose continuing round to behind the driver's door and up to the top of the windscreen and a full height 'double arrow' logo. These locomotives had the top of the nose painted black to lower the risk of the driver being dazzled by the sun. Freight-allocated examples received a similar livery - the only difference being the blue was replaced by freight grey. In 1987, the Sectors were launched, incorporating a new livery of 'three tone grey'; a light grey lower bodyside, medium grey cantrail and a dark grey roof, along with a bright Sector logo (Coal, Metals, Petroleum, Distribution, General and Construction). In addition a metal double arrow logo was fitted. This livery co-existed with plain blue, large logo blue/grey and the new InterCity and Regional Railways liveries right up to the end of British Rail in 1996.

Some locomotives in the 'sectorised company' pools received Transrail Freight logos or Mainline Freight 'Rolling Balls' over their 3TG (three tone grey) colours, while Loadhaul locomotives were painted orange and black and Mainline locomotives received 'aircraft' blue with silver stripes. Departmental locomotives were initially painted in a plain grey livery, but this didn't find favour and was modified into 'Dutch' grey and yellow livery, similar to that of Nederlandse Spoorwegen. 37 093 was mocked up as a "police" locomotive which pulled over a Class 43 HST power car for speeding in an InterCity 125 advert broadcast in the 1980s.

TOPS renumbering 

As with many diesel classes, the TOPS renumbering was implemented in a straightforward manner, with the locomotive numbers remaining in sequence. Thus 6701 became 37001 and D6999 became 37299; while D6600–D6608 became 37300–37308. The remaining locomotive, D6700 became 37119, instead of D6819, which became 37283, the number being unused as D6983 was destroyed in an accident in 1965.  As members of the class were altered later in their careers, they were renumbered, some more than once.

D6983 was withdrawn in December 1965 following a fatal collision with a derailed Class 47, number D1671 "THOR", in South Wales, near Bridgend as the result of a landslip. D6983 was the first EE Type 3 to be withdrawn and as a result, the only locomotive in the entire class not to receive a TOPS number. The remains of both locomotives were sold to local scrap merchants, R.S. Hayes, and cut up the following year.

Sub-classes 
In the 1980s the Class 37 locomotives were extensively refurbished from that point 37/0 refers to the original version. The work took place at British Rail Engineering's Crewe Works except for the 37/3 subclass whose bogies were replaced at various depots.

Class 37/0

This designation covered all 309 locomotives as built, but with such a large number of locomotives and with two companies involved in the building, there were several differences within this sub-class alone. The most visible external difference was that the first 119 locos (originally) had a "split" headcode box; for these locos the four digit train reporting number was shown in two square boxes, each containing two digits and separated by a pair of connecting doors, designed to allow the train crew to be exchanged while in motion. Later locomotives had a single centrally placed headcode box and also had the horns mounted on the roof, rather than built into the nose of the locomotive. This difference was the reason for the double change in numbers (involving D6700 and D6819) when implementing the TOPS scheme described earlier.

Class 37/3

There were two incarnations of a 37/3 subclass. The first was a group of 12 Motherwell allocated locos that were fitted with strengthened couplings and modified brake blocks for working the heavy trains to Ravenscraig. These were all renumbered back to their original numbers by the end of 1988.

The second set of locos were rebogied at various depots with the regeared cast frame type 'CP7 Bogie'. The fuel capacity was doubled by using the redundant train heating boiler water tanks but no other changes were made.

Class 37/4

With ETH (Electric Train Heating) replacing 'steam heated' coaches, some of this class received ETH Supply when refurbished at Crewe Works during 1985 and 1986. During this refurbishment, the locomotives also received regeared CP7 bogies and the English electric generator was replaced with a Brush BA1005A alternator. Extensive re-wiring, as well as a full repaint into BR Large Logo was undertaken. The modifications allowed the rebuilt locomotives to work passenger trains all year round, with the 31 strong fleet being split between Wales and Scotland, Scotland receiving the first 25 and Wales the other six.

After the extensive refurbishment, the locomotives were allocated the 37/4 sub-class, following the trend of renumbering 'ETH' fitted locomotives xx/4s, (e.g. 474xx and 314xx).

The next chapter saw the entire sub-class pass to Transrail Freight, which was one of the three regional freight operating companies prior to the privatisation of the entire British Rail network.

Over the years, the locomotives have received a large number of liveries: BR Green, Regional Railways, Trainload Grey, EWS maroon, Transrail Freight, BR Large Logo and Mainline, to name a few.

The Cambrian, North Wales Coast, Rhymney, West Highland, South Wales and West Country all benefited from the use of 37/4s.

Locomotive hauled operations had virtually ceased by the early 2000s, thanks to the widespread introduction of second-generation diesel multiple units and the replacement of loco hauled trains by multiple units, although the sub-class did hold out on the Cardiff–Rhymney trains for Arriva Trains Wales for some years. 37411 and 37425 were specially painted to mark the end of loco-hauled services on the line, in April 2005, these repaints being funded by Arriva.

In late 2010 DB Schenker put all of its remaining 37/4s up for sale, with many examples expected to be sold for scrap. Direct Rail Services (DRS) subsequently bought most of the remaining class 37/4s, for use on nuclear flask traffic. These later found further use in 2018/19 on Cumbrian Coast passenger services and East Anglian passenger services between Norwich and Great Yarmouth/Lowestoft, allowing for multiple units to be cascaded (in the first instance) and covering for accident damaged units (in the second). Between 2019 and early 2020 Colas Rail hired three Class 37s, including 37418 and 37421, to Transport for Wales for use (once again) on peak hour commuter services on the Rhymney line.

Class 37/5

This class were updated in similar fashion to the 37/4 subclass, except that they did not receive electric train heating and some were fitted with Sandite ports. Locomotives previously numbered between 37001 and 37119 (those which had split headcode boxes) were given new numbers from 37501 upwards (curtailed at 37521); those previously numbered between 37120 and 37308 were renumbered from 37699 downwards (curtailed at 37667). Nine locomotives from the first batch and three from the second were later modified for use with the aborted Channel Tunnel sleeper Nightstar project, reclassified 37/6 and renumbered 37601–37612 (see below).

Class 37/6

Eurostar (at the time European Passenger Services) had 12 locomotives modified (all ex-37/5) as Class 37/6, with the intention that they would haul overnight international trains ("Nightstar") over the non-electrified sections of their routes in Britain. However, these services were never introduced, and, in 1997, Eurostar sold six of its locomotives to Direct Rail Services (DRS), with a further three sold in 2000. The remaining three locomotives were retained by Eurostar for a variety of tasks, including driver training, route learning, and for rescuing failed Class 373 units. Once Eurostar moved its operations to its new depot at Temple Mills, its Class 37 locomotives became redundant and they too were sold to DRS in 2007.  DRS has subsequently sold some of them, Europhoenix being the principal recipient.  The Europhoenix 37/6s are used on test trains and have been used to haul EMUs to and from works and to rail-connected scrapyards.

Class 37/7

The Class 37/7 sub-class was intended primarily for heavy freight work, with extra ballast and modified gearing.

As part of the major refurbishment scheme of the Class 37 locomotives in the 1980s, another freight dedicated fleet of 44 Class 37s was created, the Class 37/7 subclass, which was very similar to the 37/5 subclass except for plating over of a bodyside window and the addition of a ballast weight to give extra 'pulling power' when hauling heavy freight trains, such as the metals trains in South Wales. Again, like the 37/5s, there were two batches completed; from phase 1 and phase 2 Class 37/0 locos. The batch numbered 37701 upwards (curtailed at 37719) were from phase 1 build locos and have the flush front ends and nose-mounted horns, whilst the batch numbered from 37899 downwards (curtailed at 37 883) were rebuilds from phase 2 locos, having the central headcode box (plated over) and roof-mounted horns. A further batch was created; locos numbered 37796–37803 had a different type of electrical equipment fitted (from Brush), as part of a trial, and differ from the other locos in the subclass internally.

In British Rail use the sub-class were particularly common in South Wales on heavy coal and metals work. They were particularly adept at working coal trains up and down the short but steeply graded branch lines around Swansea and Cardiff, to collieries such as Tower Colliery, Coedbach and Cwmbargoed. They operated merry-go-round trains of 32-ton HAA air-braked hoppers, usually numbering 32 wagons, between collieries, washeries, open cast mines and disposal points to power stations such as Aberthaw and occasionally further afield.

Their use on Metals Sector trains, usually from Llanwern, Port Talbot or English metal works such as Scunthorpe, saw them hauling very heavy trains between docks, works and purchasers in Britain. Cardiff had a large allocation of 37/7s, some waiting on standby, ready for a call from the mills requiring more wagons to handle any extra traffic. Eventually this work was taken over by Class 56s and Class 60s. This Metals traffic would also become the domain of the sub-class 37/9, which to all intents and purposes was a 37/7 but with a different prime mover.

When EWS introduced its 250 Class 66s, from 1998, many of the sub-class were put into store. Some have since been involved in construction work in France and Spain building new high-speed lines. A total of 15 were sent to Spain and an additional two were sent to Italy. Most subsequently returned to the UK, although a handful were broken up abroad.

Class 37/9 

In 1986, four Class 37s, numbers 37150/148/249/124 respectively, were converted to test the Mirrlees MB275T engine and Brush alternator for the proposed Class 38, and were numbered 37901–904. These were followed in 1987 by 37905/6, converted from 37136/206, which were fitted with the alternative pairing of a Ruston RK270T engine and GEC alternator. All six locomotives were fitted with new bogies, and had ballast weights to increase their overall weight to 120 tons. Although intended as a testbed for the proposed Class 38, the two power units fitted were those considered for the Class 60, which was eventually delivered with an enlarged version of the Mirrlees MB275T. They all had modifications similar to that of Class 37/7, including new nose grilles, removal of the central bodyside windows and 4 fire extinguisher ports. However, 37901-904 had a heavily modified central roof section, consisting of flat panels rather than the curved sheets of the original. All 6 had a new exhaust port fitted, replacing the two of the original design.

All six Class 37/9s were delivered in Railfreight Grey livery, later receiving 3TG metals sub sector livery, and operated as part of the British Rail Heavy Metals sector, being based in South Wales and hauling trains normally rostered for the much more powerful Class 56 such as the Port Talbot Steelworks - Llanwern Iron Ore tipplers. During the late 1990s, use of the Class 37/9s declined due to availability of the newer and more powerful Class 66s and problems maintaining such a small number of non-standard locos, with all six officially designated as being in storage in 1999.

This was not, however, the end of the sub-class. In July 2000, 37906 was designated as part of the EWS heritage fleet but has since been sold into preservation, joining 37901 and 37905. 37902 was sold to Direct Rail Services in 2003, but was scrapped and cut up in 2005 after a review by DRS. 37904 was cut up at CF Booth's in Rotherham in November 2004 and 37 903 was scrapped at Crewe Diesel TMD in April 2005. 37901 has since been sold to Europhoenix and returned to service (complete with its Mirrlees Pioneer name). 37905 was purchased by UK Rail Leasing and is presently stored at its Leicester depot. In October 2019, 37906 Battlefield Line Railway was sold.

Operations

British Rail

During their service on British Rail, the Class 37s found use on both passenger and freight workings, being one of the mainstays of the BR fleet. While freight use was widespread, passenger work was predominantly in the Eastern Region with use on London - Norwich and Cambridge/King's Lynn services, the latter through to the 1980s and in West Wales on services west of Swansea to Fishguard Harbour, Milford Haven and Pembroke Dock. Darnall's (later Tinsley's) 37s were used on various passenger services in the Sheffield area, notably the Pullman service to London King's Cross. Hull Dairycoates' 37s were used on local stopping services as well as on King's Cross portions down to Doncaster.

In the early 1980s, the remaining steam-heat capable locomotives gravitated to Scotland, eventually replacing both Class 27s on the West Highland Line and Class 26s on the Far North and Kyle of Lochalsh lines. However, their use became difficult once ETH-fitted Mark 2 and Mark 3 coaches moved north. The sleeper trains were particularly troublesome. To this end, steam-heat 37/0s were coupled to ETHELs (Electric Train Heating Ex-Locomotive - essentially Class 25s with isolated traction motors that provided Electric Train Heating) which provided the necessary power to run them.

Class 37s were subject to several modifications during their time in service. One short-lived experiment involved 37 175 receiving CP5 'self-steering bogies' designed to reduce excess wear and noise on the tightly-curved West Highland line to Fort William and Mallaig. This however, proved too expensive to be practicable. Some Inverness allocated Class 37s received 'car lights'; these were essentially spotlights that made them more visible on the sharply curved Scottish branches, especially to users of level crossings. These were eventually either removed or superseded by the modern 'sealed beam' lights that became compulsory from 1993. Other classes fitted with these or similar lights were Class 24s, Class 26s, Class 47s and a solitary Class 86 86 225.

The other notable use was of nominally freight locomotives to Aberystwyth over the Cambrian line, in this case taking over from Class 25s on the holiday trains.

From 1985, the 37/4 subclass took over on the Scottish lines although the use of original 37/0s continued in the summer when train supply was not required. The Welsh allocation in turn took over from the 37/0s on the Cambrian as well as from Class 33s on Crewe–Cardiff workings. They were also used on the Bristol–Cardiff/Swansea leg of services from Portsmouth Harbour and later on the Heart of Wessex line.

Over time they were displaced from most passenger work by new build DMUs such as the Sprinter units, though they still found work in the summer and on secondary services from time to time through the 1990s as traffic demand required. This saw use both on the North Wales Coast and, most remarkably, Cardiff–Rhymney local services through to 2006. In Scotland after being displaced from the West Highland and far north routes, 37/4s were used on two diagrams on the Inverness–Edinburgh route for several years as well as being used to Kyle of Lochalsh in the summer and on Inverness–Aberdeen services. The final daily work in Scotland was the Fort William Caledonian Sleeper, this ending in June 2006.

Their freight work similarly reduced, being displaced by higher powered locomotives such as the Class 56 and Class 58 locomotives on coal trains, though they continued on other cargos such as oil tankers for longer.

After privatisation
In the 1980s, many locomotives were refurbished, which has contributed to the Class 37 fleet becoming one of the longest surviving classes on British railways. However, the introduction of new Class 66 locomotives has meant many 37s have been withdrawn or scrapped. English Welsh & Scottish and Direct Rail Services operated small fleets, with several other examples also operated by spot-hire companies. However, second-hand Class 37s have also proved popular in the export market, with some examples operating in Spain and France, serving the construction of those countries' high-speed railway networks. As of 2022, numerous examples of the class are still in mainline service, despite all of them being more than fifty-seven years old.

Colas Rail
Colas Rail owns ex-preservation 37057, 37099, 37116, 37175, 37219, 37254, 37421, all currently operational.

Additionally, Colas purchased 37146, 37188 and 37207 with the intention of returning them to main line duty but, as of March 2020, 37146 is unlikely to receive its intended overhaul and is expected to be sold or used as a parts donor. 37188 was broken up at UK Rail Leasing's Leicester depot, in 2019.

Between July 2019 and March 2020, three Colas Rail Class 37s (Nos. 37025, 418, 421) operated peak time loco-hauled services on the Rhymney line with eight Mark 2 carriages, the first passenger loco-hauled services on the route since 2005, due to a lack of rolling stock caused by the two-year delay on the Class 769 that was scheduled to run services on the route.

Direct Rail Services

Direct Rail Services (DRS) has a variety of Class 37s operational and others stored. DRS originally purchased and operated a mix of class 37/0s, 37/4s, 37/5s and 37/6s . Most of the DRS 37s were used on nuclear flask services coming from a host of places including Hunterston, Torness, Heysham, Hartlepool, Sizewell, Bridgwater, Valley, Dungeness, but are now being replaced by Class 68s. These are empty or full FNA wagons often containing spent nuclear fuel. Following a review of traction requirements and delivery of its new Vossloh/Stadler UK Light Class 68 diesels and Stadler UK Dual Class 88 bi-mode locomotives, DRS has stored, withdrawn or sold most of its Class 37 fleet, apart from the 37/4s.

In July 2016, 37424 was renumbered 37558 and named Avro Vulcan XH558.

DRS Class 37s were hired to power passenger services on the Wherry lines (Norwich to Great Yarmouth/Lowestoft) for Greater Anglia between June 2015 and September 2019, due to a shortage of diesel multiple units, as a result of two serious accidents. Until December 2018 they also hauled passenger services on the Cumbrian Coast line on behalf of Northern Rail (until 2016) and then its successor, Northern.

EWS/DB Schenker

EWS usually used Class 37s in pairs, for freight workings. Additionally EWS used the Class 37s on railtours or charter hire to train operating companies. For example, in 2005 Arriva Trains Wales used 37/4 haulage on the Rhymney valley line, from a pool of four locomotives, these locomotives being 37405 (EWS livery), 37411 (BR green livery), 37419 (EWS livery) and 37425 (BR Large Logo). 37419 replaced 37408 Loch Rannoch, which was involved in a collision with parked stock at Rhymney sidings, which was suspected to be caused by vandals. 37408 suffered extensive damage and was written off at Toton TMD with its power unit removed and used to revive 37422. Its body was later scrapped at European Metal Recycling, Kingsbury, Warwickshire.

By mid-2008, only three EWS Class 37s were still in regular use on the mainline (37401, 417, 422). 37422 was placed in WNTS tactical store pool in September leaving only 37 401 and 417 in traffic. On 16 December, 37 417 suffered serious engine failure and was sent to Eastleigh for storage, resulting in 37401 becoming the only Class 37 to remain in traffic into the new DB Schenker era.

DB Schenker had one operational Class 37/4, 37401, at the time of its rebranding from EWS on 1 January 2009. DB Schenker also had hired locomotives for temporary duties, such as 37 423 from Direct Rail Services (DRS) to cover for failed 37417. DB Schenker 37401 (and DRS's 37 423) were on snowplough duty at Inverness for the winter months. 37401, DB Schenker's sole operational English Electric Type 3 at the time, was reported sounding rough and was later stored, although this did not last long, as it was soon sent to Toton TMD for repairs along with 37406 The Saltire Society.

37401, DB Schenker's most reliable Class 37, was repaired and returned to service. 37406 was returned to service, failing on its first working. 37670 was also returned operational.

37419 was prepared for a return to traffic and repainted into DB Schenker livery, however its long time in store did not help its power unit and it failed with a serious engine fault on its trial run. The locomotive is now operational with DRS.

DB Schenker had the largest route for railhead treatment trains for Autumn 2009 and required Class 37 haulage due to their route availability. Much speculation was surrounding the return of several Class 37s, however DB Schenker was eventually given clearance from Network Rail to use Class 66s and 67s on the routes instead, resulting in the Class 37 plan being ditched despite several of the machines having their air horns moved onto the nose to resolve clearance problems.

Reliability problems plagued 37670 during its short time in traffic and the loco was eventually stored unserviceable.

With the storage of 37670, this meant that (once again) 37401 was the sole operational Class 37 in active service under DB Schenker. To take the strain off 37401, 37425 Pride of the Valleys was fitted with OTMR safety equipment and was returned fully operational. The locomotive retained in BR blue large logo livery, however (like 37670) it was also plagued with unreliability.

As of summer 2010, DB Schenker Rail UK ceased using Class 37s.

In June 2013, DB Schenker offered six Class 37s for sale: 37703, 37714, 37716, 37718, 37800 and 37884. These had been stored out of use at Dollands Moor after returning from mainland Europe, where they had been working on the construction of a new high speed line. 37703 went on hire/loaned (but still owned by Direct Rail Services) to the Scottish Railway Preservation Society, 37 703/714/716/718 were bought by Direct Rail Services. 37718 was scrapped at CF Booth, Rotherham in July 2015. 37800 and 37884 were bought by Europhoenix and once restored to working order, went on long term hire to Rail Operations Group in a dual Europhoenix/ROG livery.

West Coast Railways

West Coast Railways (WCR) purchased four locomotives from Ian Riley Engineering in 2004. The two operational locomotives (nos. 37197 and 37261) were used on charter trains or as standby locomotives for The Jacobite steam-hauled excursion services from Fort William to Mallaig during 2005. These two, along with non-operational 37423, have since been sold to DRS. The fourth (no. 37 235) was for spares.

In late 2007, WCR purchased several non-operational Class 37/5 and Class 37/7s from EWS: nos. 37517, 37668, 37676, 37685, 37706, 37712 and 37710. Of the acquired locomotives 37710 will be used as a source of spares, 37676 and 37712 were the first two returned to mainline. 37676 was named Loch Rannoch at a special event in Carnforth Steamtown. 37712 suffered a fire on an empty coaching stock move and was subsequently stored. It is known that major work will need to be done on 37712, however demand exists for chartered Class 37s.

By the end of 2019, WCR had seven Class 37s running in service: nos. 37516, 37518, 37668, 37669, 37676, 37685, 37706 with nos. 37710 as a spares donor and 37517 and 37712 stored.

Locomotive Services Limited
Since 2017 Locomotive Services Limited (LSL) began to acquire a number of class 37s to use alongside its own fleet of BR Class 47s. As of February 2020 LSL has four on its books and running in service: nos. 37190, 37521, 37667 and 37688. Not all of these are owned by LSL, as some are hired in by the company from their owners, for use on LSL-run trains.

Rail Operations Group

Rail Operations Group (ROG) leases six Class 37s (37510, 37601, 37608, 37611, 37800, 37884) from Europhoenix for frequent moves of passenger stock. These have been modified to be able to couple with and operate the brakes on various EMU classes without the need for translator vehicles.

Operators

Summary 
Fleet 2020 of mainline registered locomotives (excluding preserved railways).

Fleet List

Accidents and incidents
 On the night of 16–17 December 1965, D6983 while hauling a train was in collision with a derailed freight hauled by D1671 Thor near Bridgend, South Wales. The driver and second man of D1671 died, and damage to both locomotives was extensive enough that even though each locomotive was barely a year old, they were withdrawn and eventually scrapped. D6983 was the first Class 37 withdrawn and the only one of the class not to be renumbered.
 In January 1988, locomotives No. 37671 and 37672 were hauling a freight train that was diverted into a siding at Tavistock Junction, Devon due to a pointsman's error. The train collided with a wagon, pushed it through the buffers and was derailed.
 Some locomotives suffered nose-end damage through minor collisions. As a result, a number of Class 37/0 variants were rebuilt with the split-headcode boxes that were a feature of the series 1 build replaced by series 2 style central headcode panels.
 On 12 May 2014, locomotive 37198, stored by Network Rail on the Great Central Railway and coupled to a Post Office Sorting Van, ran away for 1.8 miles (2.9 km) due to an ineffectively placed wheel scotch. It then struck the end vehicle of a rake of five Mark 1 coaches.

Departmental

Network Rail ERTMS project
Network Rail restored four Class 37s as part of the European Rail Traffic Management System (ERTMS) trial project on the Cambrian Line. The site of the restoration was the Barrow Hill Roundhouse, where ex-HNRC locomotives 37100, 37170, 37178 and 37217 were taken in. The restored Class 37s for ERTMS use were re-designated as Class 97/3, numbered 97301, 97302, 97303 and 97304.

The class was chosen because of its original fitment with both air and vacuum braking, a feature which will allow them to pull both modern freight trains as well as special enthusiast trains. The main work of the locomotives is to pull on-track machines (such as tampers) through the ERTMS section.

The 97/3s are based at the newly constructed Coleham Depot for the duration of the ERTMS testing on the Cambrian Line, thereafter they are used to pilot trains not fitted with the ERTMS signalling system.  They are also used to work Network Rail test trains on other parts of the network when not required for ERTMS testing.

These locos were effectively refurbished, having been completely stripped down to bare steel, with reconditioned engines, somewhat updated cabs, all new signalling systems installed (ERTMS in this instance) and extensive re-wiring.

97302, 303, and 304 all remain operational as of August 2022.  97301 is currently stored at Derby RTC.

Preservation

Class 37 locomotives have proved to be very popular, with many examples saved for preservation on heritage railways as well by enthusiast groups. Notable examples saved include the first-built locomotive, No. D6700, and the last built locomotive 37308.

A number of the class have been sold back out of preservation to mainline operators including both Ruston-engined prototypes Nos. 37905/6. One locomotive, 37372, has been procured by a group called the Baby Deltic Project, for conversion into a replica of a Class 23 Baby Deltic.

Models 
In 1965 Hornby Railways launched its first version of the BR Class 37 in OO gauge.

In 2020 Accurascale announced that they will release their own OO gauge Class 37 model in 2023.

See also 
 Passenger locomotives in use in the UK
 BR Class 37 renumbering

References

Preserved locomotives

Sources

Further reading

External links 

 The Class 37 Locomotive Group Owners of 37003
 The Growler Group Class 37 37215, 37248 (custodians)

37
Co-Co locomotives
English Electric locomotives
Vulcan Foundry locomotives
Robert Stephenson and Hawthorns locomotives
Railway locomotives introduced in 1960
Diesel-electric locomotives of Great Britain
Standard gauge locomotives of Great Britain
Co'Co' Diesel Locomotives of Europe